The 1st annual Billboard Latin Music Awards which honor the most popular albums, songs, and performers in Latin music took place in Miami.

Pop

Pop album of the year
Aries, Luis Miguel

Pop artist of the year, male
Luis Miguel

Pop artist of the year, female
Ana Gabriel

Pop duo or group of the year
Gipsy Kings

Pop new artist of the year
Maná

Pop song of the year
Nunca Voy a Olvidarte, Cristian Castro

Tropical/Salsa

Tropical/salsa album of the year
Mi Tierra, Gloria Estefan

Tropical/salsa artist of the year, male

Jerry Rivera

Tropical/salsa artist of the year, female
Gloria Estefan

Tropical/salsa artist of the year, duo or group
Juan Luis Guerra

Tropical/salsa artist of the year, new artist
Marc Anthony

Tropical/salsa song of the year
Mi Tierra, Gloria Estefan

Regional Mexican

Regional Mexican album of the year
Selena Live!, Selena

Regional Mexican artist of the year, male
Emilio Navaira

Regional Mexican artist of the year, female
Selena

Regional Mexican artist of the year, duo or group
Banda Machos

Regional Mexican artist of the year, new artist
Jay Perez

Regional Mexican song of the year
Me Estoy Enamorando, La Mafia

Other awards

Hot latin tracks of the year
Me Estoy Enamorando, La Mafia

Hot latin tracks artist of the year
Los Fantasmas del Caribe

Latin rap artist of the year
El General

Latin rock artist of the year
Maldita Vecindad

Latin pop/rock artist of the year
Maná

Contemporary Latin jazz album of the year
Dreams & Desires, Roberto Perera

Billboard Lifetime achievement award
Emilio Estefan

Billboard Latin Music Hall of Fame
Cachao

References

Billboard Latin Music Awards
Latin Billboard Music Awards
Latin Billboard Music Awards
Billboard Music Awards
Latin Billboard Music